Ilaria Zane (born 10 February 1992) is an Italian professional triathlete.

Achievements

National titles
Zane won two national championships at individual senior level.

Olympic: 2019
Sprint: 2022

References

External links
 

1992 births
Living people
Italian female triathletes
21st-century Italian women